The 2018 Kremlin  Cup (also known as the 2018 VTB Kremlin Cup for sponsorship reasons) was a tennis tournament played on indoor hard courts. It was the 29th edition of the Kremlin Cup for the men and the 23rd edition for the women. The tournament was part of the ATP World Tour 250 Series of the 2018 ATP World Tour, and of the Premier Series of the 2018 WTA Tour. It was the last tournament for now to be held at the Olympic Stadium in Moscow, Russia, from 15 October through 21 October 2018.

ATP singles main-draw entrants

Seeds

 Rankings are as of October 8, 2018

Other entrants
The following players received wildcards into the singles main draw:
  Karen Khachanov
  Nick Kyrgios
  Evgeny Karlovskiy

The following players received entry from the qualifying draw:
  Alexander Bublik
  Egor Gerasimov
  Filip Horanský
  Lukáš Rosol

The following player received entry as a lucky loser:
  Ričardas Berankis

Withdrawals
Before the tournament
  Jérémy Chardy → replaced by  Ričardas Berankis
  Pablo Cuevas → replaced by  Laslo Đere
  João Sousa → replaced by  Evgeny Donskoy

During the tournament
  Nick Kyrgios

Retirements
  Denis Istomin

ATP doubles main-draw entrants

Seeds

1 Rankings are as of October 8, 2018

Other entrants
The following pairs received wildcards into the doubles main draw:
  Evgeny Donskoy /  Ivan Gakhov
  Evgeny Karlovskiy /  Daniil Medvedev

Withdrawals
During the tournament
  Karen Khachanov
  Nick Kyrgios

WTA singles main-draw entrants

Seeds

 Rankings are as of October 8, 2018

Other entrants
The following players received wildcards into the singles main draw:
  Simona Halep
  Anna Kalinskaya
  Anastasia Potapova
  Sloane Stephens

The following players received entry from the qualifying draw:
  Ons Jabeur
  Irina Khromacheva
  Natalia Vikhlyantseva
  Vera Zvonareva

The following players received entry as lucky losers: 
  Vitalia Diatchenko
  Valentini Grammatikopoulou

Withdrawals
Before the tournament
  Dominika Cibulková → replaced by  Ajla Tomljanović
  Danielle Collins → replaced by  Ekaterina Makarova
  Simona Halep → replaced by  Valentini Grammatikopoulou
  Kaia Kanepi → replaced by  Yulia Putintseva
  Aryna Sabalenka → replaced by  Vitalia Diatchenko
  Barbora Strýcová → replaced by  Irina-Camelia Begu

WTA doubles main-draw entrants

Seeds

1 Rankings are as of October 8, 2018

Other entrants
The following pair received a wildcard into the doubles main draw:
  Nigina Abduraimova /  Anna Kalinskaya

The following pair received entry as alternates:
  Olga Doroshina /  Polina Monova

Withdrawals
Before the tournament
  Ana Bogdan

Champions

Men's singles

 Karen Khachanov def.  Adrian Mannarino, 6–2, 6–2

Women's singles

 Daria Kasatkina def.  Ons Jabeur, 2–6, 7–6(7–3), 6–4

Men's doubles

 Austin Krajicek /  Rajeev Ram def.  Max Mirnyi /  Philipp Oswald, 7–6(7–4), 6–4

Women's doubles

 Alexandra Panova /  Laura Siegemund def.  Darija Jurak /  Raluca Olaru, 6–2, 7–6(7–2)

References

External links
 

2018
Kremlin Cup
Kremlin Cup
Kremlin Cup
Kremlin Cup